Sorkh Kola (also Romanized as Sorkh Kolā and Sorkh Kalā; also known as Sorkh Kūlā) is a village in Esfivard-e Shurab Rural District, in the Central District of Sari County, Mazandaran Province, Iran. At the 2006 census, its population was 1,656, in 434 families.

References 

Populated places in Sari County